Stathmonotus sinuscalifornici, the California worm blenny or the Gulf worm blenny, is a species of chaenopsid blenny known from the Gulf of California, in the eastern central Pacific ocean. It can reach a maximum length of  TL. This species feeds primarily on zooplankton.

References
Bibliography
 Chabanaud, P., 1942 Contribution à la morphologie de Téléostéens appartenant à diverses familles de l'ordre des Blennoidea. Description d'une espèce et d'un genre inédits. Bulletin de la Société Zoologique de France v. 67: 111–120.
Citations

sinuscalifornici
Fish described in 1942